Kitee Airfield  is an aerodrome in Kitee, Finland.

See also
List of airports in Finland

References

External links
 Town of Kitee – Airfield 
 VFR Suomi/Finland – Kitee Airfield
 Lentopaikat.net – Kitee Airfield 

Airports in Finland
Airfield
Buildings and structures in North Karelia